Arbor Grove, also known as Arbor, is an unincorporated community in southeastern Houston County, Texas. The community had a post office from 1901 to 1906.

References

Unincorporated communities in Houston County, Texas
Unincorporated communities in Texas